The  Maryland Maniacs season was the team's second season as a football franchise and second in the Indoor Football League (IFL). One of twenty-five teams competing in the IFL for the 2010 season, the Maniacs were members of the Atlantic East Division of the United Conference. The team played their home games at Cole Field House in College Park, Maryland.

Schedule

Regular season

Standings

Roster

References

Maryland Maniacs
Maryland Maniacs
American football in Maryland